Dickson Yu Tak-shing (born 2 September 1989) is a Hong Kong actor, television presenter, radio DJ and model
. In 2016, Yu debuted as an actor, and scored his first major role in 2017, as "Ocean" in TVB's My Ages Apart.

Biography
Yu  attended the Pun U Association Wah Yan Primary School and the prestigious secondary school, Wah Yan College. Yu was a competitive swimmer, and was a member of Hong Kong's national swimming team. Despite being a frequent competitor in athletic meets, Yu failed to qualify for the Asian Games. This led to his decision to forgo his swimming career.

In 2011, Yu graduated with a degree in business administration from the City University of Hong Kong. He worked for a brand company, but quit the job to become a radio DJ and writer for Metro Broadcast. In 2013, Ricky Fan introduced him to TVB.

Yu's first gig with TVB was being a presenter for TVB Sports News. In 2015, Yu was offered a spot to host the children's program series Kids, Think Big. In 2016, he crossed over to TVB's drama department, and was trained by Anthony Wong. He earned minor speak roles in Blue Veins (2016) and Two Steps from Heaven (2016). Yu rose to popularity after portraying "Ocean" in the 2017 television drama My Ages Apart.

On 8 August 2018, Yu passed out during a football match in Sai Ying Pun. He was brought to Queen Mary Hospital and was in intensive care. On 11 August 2018, Yu finally regained consciousness and was understood that a defibrillator was used to save his life.

In May 2022, Dickson announced his departure from TVB, ending an 8 year work-contract.

Filmography

Dramas

Variety Shows

Radio presenter

TV presenter

References

External links
 Dickson Yu on YouTube
  
 

1989 births
Living people
21st-century Hong Kong male actors
Hong Kong male television actors
Canadian-born Hong Kong artists